Dennis W. Day (July 12, 1942 – July 17, 2018) was an American actor, singer, dancer, and theater director, best known as one of the original cast members of The Mickey Mouse Club. After ending his career as a child actor, he went on to work as a theater director before relocating to Oregon in the 1980s.

Day disappeared in July 2018, and was found dead several months later. A roommate was charged with his death in 2019.

Life and career

Early life
Day was born in Las Vegas, Nevada, and later moved to Downey, California. He started acting at age six and after auditioning with his sister, was a Mouseketeer for the first two seasons of The Mickey Mouse Club in 1955–1957. At age 11, he appeared in a minor uncredited role in the film A Lion Is in the Streets (1953) with James Cagney.

He came out as gay to his family and moved to San Francisco when he turned 18, though he later told a Rolling Stone interviewer in 1971 that he was bisexual and had used drugs. He continued to work as an actor and dancer, including at La MaMa Theatre in New York and in Los Angeles.

Later life
Day married Henry Ernest Caswell, his partner since the early 1970s, in 2009. Day and Caswell at one time ran a guesthouse for gay actors in San Francisco; from the 1960s until the early 1980s, Day worked for the Living History Centre, producing Renaissance and Dickens Christmas fairs, playing Newington Butts at the Renaissance fairs and also coaching other actors. They moved in the mid-1980s to Oregon, first settling in Ashland, and then in Phoenix, where they had a house. Caswell also worked for the Oregon Shakespeare Festival, while Day made and sold wine jelly and worked seasonally for Harry & David.

Disappearance and death
Day was reportedly last seen on July 17, 2018 after Caswell, who has dementia, was admitted to the hospital after a fall. Day reportedly left on foot, telling a third housemate, a live-in handyman, that he was going to visit friends, but his cat and dog were left behind, and the dog was found roaming by neighbors. One neighbor had a letter written by Day mentioning being assaulted by the handyman, who told police that Day was also exhibiting signs of mental problems. In August 2018, police searched the property after neighbors complained of a "bad smell". Friends began asking for help locating him starting in November that year, and in February 2019, after his family learned of his disappearance, his case was featured on an episode of Dateline NBC. In March 2019, his case was profiled on the podcast The Vanished.

Police had searched Day's residence and elsewhere, but in early April 2019, human remains were discovered on the property. On June 6, 2019, the remains were confirmed as those of Day, though a cause of death was not announced. On July 5, 2019, Oregon State Police arrested the former handyman in connection to Day's death. The man, 36-year-old Daniel James Burda, was charged with several crimes in connection with Day's death, including manslaughter, criminally negligent homicide, and identity theft.

See also
List of solved missing person cases
List of unsolved murders

Filmography

References

External links
 

1942 births
2010s missing person cases
2018 deaths
American male dancers
American male film actors
American male singers
American male television actors
Disney people
Formerly missing people
American gay actors
LGBT theatre directors
Male murder victims
Missing person cases in Oregon
Mouseketeers
People from Ashland, Oregon
People from Downey, California
Male actors from Las Vegas
Male actors from Los Angeles
Male actors from New York City
People from Phoenix, Oregon
Male actors from San Francisco
Unsolved murders in the United States